Chasmina is a genus of moths of the family Noctuidae.

Species
 Chasmina alcidamea Druce, 1890
 Chasmina basiflava Holloway, 1979
 Chasmina candida Walker, 1865
 Chasmina coremata Holloway, 1989
 Chasmina fasciculosa Walker, 1858
 Chasmina gracilipalpis Warren, 1912
 Chasmina judicata Walker, 1858
 Chasmina lispodes Turner, 1936
 Chasmina malagasy Viette, 1965
 Chasmina mexicana Draudt, 1927
 Chasmina nigropunctata Bethune-Baker, 1908
 Chasmina pulchra Walker, [1858]
 Chasmina sundana Holloway, 1989
 Chasmina tenuilinea Hampson, 1910
 Chasmina tibialis (Fabricius, 1775)
 Chasmina tibiopunctata Bethune-Baker, 1908
 Chasmina verticata Warren, 1913
 Chasmina vestae (Guenée, 1852)
 Chasmina viridis Robinson, 1975
 Chasmina zonata Walker, 1866

References

 Chasmina at Markku Savela's Lepidoptera and Some Other Life Forms
 Natural History Museum Lepidoptera genus database

Hadeninae